David George Staveley Penny, 3rd Viscount Marchwood (22 May 1936 – 3 October 2022) was a British peer, a Conservative member of the House of Lords from 1979 to 1999.

The son of Peter George Penny, 2nd Viscount Marchwood, and his wife Pamela Colton-Fox, he was educated at Winchester College and then commissioned into the Royal Horse Guards as a 2nd Lieutenant, serving between 1955 and 1957. He worked for Cadbury Schweppes between 1958 and 1985, when he became managing director of Moët & Chandon (London).

On 6 April 1979, he succeeded his father as Viscount Marchwood, of Penang and of Marchwood, Hampshire (U.K., 1945), Baron Marchwood, of Penang and of Marchwood (U.K., 1937), and as a baronet. He sat in the House of Lords as a Conservative until 1999.

On 26 September 1964, Marchwood married firstly Tessa Jane Norris, daughter of Wilfred Francis Norris, and with her had three sons: Peter George Worsley Penny, later 4th Viscount Marchwood (born 1965),  Nicholas Mark Staveley Penny (born 1967), and Edward James Frederick Penny (born 1970).

He married, secondly Sylvia Kathleen Willis Fleming Bastin, daughter of George Edward Restalic Bastin, on 13 December 2001. In 2003, he was living at 5 Buckingham Mews, Westminster.

Marchwood died on 3 October 2022, aged 86, and was succeeded in his peerages by his eldest son.

Notes

External links

1936 births
2022 deaths
People educated at Winchester College
Royal Horse Guards officers
Viscounts in the Peerage of the United Kingdom